The 4th Critics' Choice Real TV Awards, presented by the Broadcast Television Journalists Association and NPACT, which recognizes excellence in nonfiction, unscripted and reality programming across broadcast, cable and streaming platforms, were held on June 12, 2022, at Fairmont Century Plaza in Los Angeles, making it the first in-person ceremony since the 1st in 2019. Nominations were announced on May 16, 2022. Of the nominated programs, Top Chef received the most nominations, with five. Top Chef also won the most awards, with three wins.

Winners and nominees
Winners are listed first and highlighted in bold:

Programs

Most major nominations
Programs that received multiple nominations are listed below, by number of nominations per work and per network:

Most major wins

References

2022 television awards
2022 in American television
 004
June 2022 events in the United States
2022 in Los Angeles